Hemidactylus mandebensis is a species of house gecko from Yemen. It is a relatively small-sized member of the Hemidactylus robustus species group.

Etymology
The specific name mandebensis refers to Bab-el-Mandeb strait, close to which the species is found.

Distribution and habitat
The specimens were observed at night climbing rock faces by irrigated fields. They were found in sympatry with several other gecko species from the genera Hemidactylus, Ptyodactylus, and Pristurus.

References

Further reading
 

Hemidactylus
Reptiles described in 2015
Reptiles of the Middle East
Endemic fauna of Yemen